Ma Wenzhu (born 11 August 1963) is a Chinese weightlifter. He competed in the men's middleweight event at the 1988 Summer Olympics. He is from Qingdao.

References

1963 births
Living people
Chinese male weightlifters
Olympic weightlifters of China
Weightlifters at the 1988 Summer Olympics
Place of birth missing (living people)
Sportspeople from Qingdao
20th-century Chinese people